Aror is a small rural town in Kenya.

The town has suffered from famine, Aror is twinned with Westport in the Republic of Ireland, the people of Westport often donate money to the people of Aror to help with infrastructure.

Populated places in Kenya